This article features the 2001 UEFA European Under-18 Championship qualifying stage. Matches were played 2000 through 2001. Two qualifying rounds were organised and seven teams qualified for the main tournament, joining host Finland.

Round 1

Group 1
All matches were played in Cyprus.

Group 2
All matches were played in Greece.

Group 3
All matches were played in Malta.

Group 4
All matches were played in Turkey.

Group 5
All matches were played in Italy.

Group 6
All matches were played in Poland.

Group 7
All matches were played in Austria.

Group 8
All matches were played in the Czech Republic.

Group 9

Group 10
All matches were played in Slovenia.

Group 11
All matches were played in Slovakia.

Group 12
All matches were played in Sweden.

Group 13
All matches were played in Croatia.

Group 14
All matches were played in Portugal.

Round 2

|}

See also
 2001 UEFA European Under-18 Championship

External links

Results by RSSSF

qual
UEFA European Under-19 Championship qualification
Qual